The 2018 FEI World Equestrian Games were held in Mill Spring, North Carolina, U.S. at the Tryon International Equestrian Center, from September 11 to September 23, 2018. It was the eighth edition of the games, which are held every four years and run by the International Federation for Equestrian Sports (FEI). This was the second time that North America hosted the Games, the previous time being in 2010, also in the United States.

Bidding process
The initial bidding process for the 2018 edition of the World Equestrian Games started in 2011 with the initial application stage. Eight countries expressed their interest, and five of them became official candidates in 2012: Rabat, Bromont, Budapest, Vienna and Wellington. Australia, Russia and Sweden withdrew before the official candidature phase.

By 2013, four of the official candidates dropped out, leaving only Bromont in the running. However, instead of awarding the Games to Canada, FEI decided to re-open the bidding process on July 1, 2013, as the Bromont bid was lacking financial support. Bromont remained in the running and was joined by two USA candidates (Wellington and Lexington) as well as Great Britain.

Great Britain and Wellington dropped out, leaving only Bromont and Lexington in contention. Bromont was finally awarded the hosting rights on June 9, 2014.

Bromont withdrew from hosting in 2016, as the financial support was not secured. Following Bromont's withdrawal, Mill Spring, North Carolina and Šamorín, Slovakia expressed their interest in hosting the event. Mill Spring was awarded the Games on November 3, 2016.

With the 2018 games, United States became the first nation to host the World Equestrian Games twice.

Venues
 Tryon International Equestrian Center, Mill Spring, North Carolina
 U.S. Trust Arena – Jumping, Dressage and Eventing (stadium jumping)
 Tryon Stadium – Ceremonies, Eventing (Dressage) and Para-dressage
 Covered Arena – Reining and Vaulting
 Driving Stadium – Driving (Dressage, Obstacle Cones)
 White Oak Course - Eventing (Cross-country) and Driving (Marathon)
 TIEC and surrounding farmland - Endurance

Officials
Appointment of (Olympic disciplines) officials was as follows:

Dressage
  Anne Gribbons (Ground Jury President)
  Katrina Wüst (Ground Jury Member)
  Mariëtte Sanders-van Gansewinkel (Ground Jury Member)
  Andrew Gardner (Ground Jury Member)
  Hans-Christian Matthiesen (Ground Jury Member)
  Annette Fransen-Iacobaeus (Ground Jury Member)
  Susan Hoevenaars (Ground Jury Member)
  Cara Whitham (Technical Delegate)

Jumping
  Frances Hesketh-Jones (Ground Jury President)
  David M. Distler (Ground Jury Member)
  Joachim Geilfus (Ground Jury Member)
  John Taylor (Ground Jury Member)
  Neill O'Connor (Ground Jury Member)
  Leopoldo Palacios (Technical Delegate)

Eventing
  Anne-Mette Binder (Ground Jury President)
  Jane Hamlin (Ground Jury Member)
  Andrew Bennie (Ground Jury Member)
  Stephan Ellenbruch (Jumping judge)
  Martin Plewa (Technical Delegate)

Para-Dressage
  Hanneke Gerritsen (Ground Jury President)
  Anne Prain (Ground Jury Member)
  Marco Orsini (Ground Jury Member)
  Kristi Wysocki (Ground Jury Member)
  Suzanne Cunningham (Ground Jury Member)
  Sarah Leitch (Ground Jury Member)
  Marc Urban (Ground Jury Member)
  Jan Holger Holtschmidt (Technical Delegate)

Logistics
Horses competing in the championships were flown in and out of Greenville-Spartanburg International Airport in Greer, South Carolina. They were then transported by horse trailers up to Tryon.

Schedule
All times Eastern Daylight Time (UTC-4)

Ceremonies

Dressage

Driving

Endurance

Eventing

Jumping

Reining

Vaulting

Para-Dressage

Participating nations
68 nations are scheduled to take part.

  Argentina (16)
  Australia (30)
  Austria (23)
  Bahrain (5)
  Belgium (26)
  Bermuda (2)
  Bolivia (2)
  Brazil (32)
  Canada (34)
  Chile (11)
  China (5)
  Colombia (6)
  Costa Rica (3)
  Czech Republic (12)
  Denmark (9)
  Ecuador (6)
  Egypt (4)
  Finland (7)
  France (29)
  Georgia (1)
  Germany (44)
  Great Britain (31)
  Guatemala (4)
  Hong Kong (5)
  Hungary (7)
  India (1)
  Ireland (15)
  Israel (7)
  Italy (33)
  Japan (18)
  Jordan (1)
  Kazakhstan (1)
  Kuwait (2)
  Latvia (1)
  Lebanon (1)
  Luxembourg (1)
  Macedonia (1)
  Mexico (14)
  Morocco (2)
  Netherlands (36)
  New Zealand (13)
  Norway (5)
  Oman (4)
  Palestine (1)
  Peru (2)
  Philippines (2)
  Poland (3)
  Portugal (16)
  Qatar (4)
  Romania (2)
  Russia (14)
  Saudi Arabia (5)
  Singapore (2)
  Slovakia (4)
  South Africa (9)
  South Korea (2)
  Spain (17)
  Sri Lanka (1)
  Sweden (17)
  Switzerland (29)
  Chinese Taipei (1)
  Thailand (1)
  Ukraine (1)
  United Arab Emirates (4)
  United States (43)
  Uruguay (7)
  Venezuela (4)
  Virgin Islands (1)

Medal summary

Dressage

Driving

Endurance

Eventing

Jumping

Reining

Vaulting

(i) - individual, (s) - squad

Para-dressage

Medal table

 Host nation

Hurricane Florence

Hurricane Florence hit the Tryon International Equestrian Center and the surrounding area during the first week of the World Equestrian Games. Reported impacts included heavy rainfall and increased gusts of wind. A special contingency plan has been addressed for the situation.

The contingency plan included accommodating all horses on-venue in permanent barns, moving grooms accommodated on-site to permanent buildings at the venue, advising shelter locations for all personnel, continuing discussions with airports and Emirates airline on any necessary steps regarding horse arrivals/departures, ensuring smaller tents in the vendor area are tie-strapped together for security, carrying out additional drainage/water channeling to prevent flooding, purchasing additional fuel tanks and filling all fuel tanks to run the generators, preparing to remove fence scrim already installed and taking down flags.

WEQx Games
Alongside the World Equestrian Games, Tryon International Equestrian Center was supposed to host the inaugural WEQx Games. WEQx Games were scheduled to feature nine spectator-friendly equine competitions that should "highlight the accessibility, diversity, athleticism, and passion for horses and horse sport for athletes of all ages".

WEQx Events:
 U-25 U.S. Open Championship (Jumping)
 U.S. Open Speed Horse (Jumping)
 DerbyX (Hunter Derby)
 Battle of the Sexes (Jumping)
 Match Race (Jumping)
 Puissance (Jumping)
 Six Bar (Jumping)
 Pony Jumpers (Jumping)
 Gladiator Polo (3x3 Polo)

The program got cancelled amidst Hurricane Florence and various organizational setbacks (delayed construction of venues, budget cuts, low ticket sales).

References

External links
FEI website
World Equestrian Games: Singer/Songwriter Katrina "Kat" Williams to headline Day of the African Equestrian gala during FEI World Equestrian Games

FEI World Equestrian Games
Horse driving competition
Equestrian sports competitions in the United States
International sports competitions hosted by the United States
FEI World Equestrian Games
FEI World Equestrian Games
FEI World Equestrian Games
FEI World Equestrian Games
Para Dressage